The Axe Gang is a reference to a gang founded in 1921, but is currently used for show in cinema. It has appeared in a few Hong Kong martial arts films.

The fictional version of the Axe Gang is based on a real-life Axe Gang in Shanghai around Japanese Occupation with a leader named Wang Ya Qiao.

Background
The Axe Gang has control over Shanghai and uses axes as a weapon of choice, usually dressed in black suits and sometimes top hats. Boxer From Shantung is perhaps the gang's earliest appearance, though they are not formally called Axe Gang within the film. The Gang also appears in Project A Part II, Drunken Master II, Marrying the Mafia II, Kung Fu Hustle, and Shanghai Affairs. Recently a Hatchet Gang is depicted in both seasons of Netflix's Iron Fist.

In Kung Fu Hustle
In the martial-arts film Kung Fu Hustle, the Axe Gang is run in a way very similar to the Italian crime mafia families or perhaps to the major Chinese Triads. The Axe Gang is led by Brother Sum. Two crossed axes forming an "X" can be seen as their recognizable logo in Kung Fu Hustle, which many if not all members have tattooed on their bodies somewhere, visible or otherwise.  The gang is shown doing dance moves in Kung Fu Hustle reminiscent of 1950s musicals.

Films
Boxer From Shantung (1972)
Queen Boxer (1972)
Project A Part II (1987)
Drunken Master II (1994)
A Chinese Odyssey (1995)
Fist of Fury (1995)
Hero (1997)
Shanghai Affairs (1998)
Kung Fu Hustle (2004)
Marrying the Mafia II (2005)
Ip Man (2008)
Snowpiercer (2013)

See also
 Hatchet man

References 

Fictional gangs
Fictional organized crime groups
Fictional mass murderers
Fictional gangsters
Fictional Chinese people
Cinema of China
Cinema of Hong Kong
Triad groups